Amesbury Town Football Club is a football club based in Amesbury, Wiltshire, England.

History
The club was established in 1904 as Amesbury Football Club. They joined the Salisbury & District Junior League, before becoming members of the Salisbury & District League in 1906. After winning the league in 1955–56, they became members of Division One of the Wiltshire League. However, after finishing third in Division One in 1958–59, the club left the division. They returned to Division One in 1972–73; despite finishing bottom of the table, they were not relegated. The following season saw them finish second-from-bottom of the division, but in 1974–75 they were league champions. They were runners-up the following season, and were placed in Senior Division One in 1976 after the league merged with the Wiltshire Combination to form the Wiltshire County League.

Amesbury began entering the FA Vase in 1978–79, and were Division One runners-up. The following season saw them win the league and reach the third round of the Vase. In 1983–84 they won the Wiltshire Senior Cup for the first time. The club were renamed Amesbury Town in 1984, and after finishing second in 1989–90, they were champions in 1990–91. They retained the league title in 1991–92, and after finishing as runners-up in 1993–94, also winning the Wiltshire Senior Cup, the club moved up to Division One of the Western League. However, after finishing bottom of Division One in 1996–97 they left to rejoin the Salisbury & District League.

After finishing as runners-up in the Salisbury & District League Premier Division in 1997–98, Amesbury joined Division Three of the Hampshire League. A fourth-place finish in their first season in the league was enough to earn promotion to the Premier Division amidst league reorganisation. In 2004 the league merged into the Wessex League, with the club becoming members of Division Two, which was renamed Division One in 2006. In 2015–16 they were Division One runners-up, and were promoted to the Premier Division. After finishing third-from-bottom of the Premier Division in 2017–18, the club were relegated back to Division One.

Season-by-season

Honours
Wiltshire County League
Division One champions 1979–80, 1990–91, 1991–92
Wiltshire League
Champions 1974–75
Wiltshire Senior Cup
Winners 1983–84, 1993–94

Records
Best FA Cup performance: Preliminary round, 2016–17
Best FA Vase performance: Third round, 1979–80
Record attendance: 625

See also
Amesbury Town F.C. players

References

External links
 

Football clubs in England
Association football clubs established in 1904
Football clubs in Wiltshire
1904 establishments in England
Wiltshire Football League
Western Football League
Hampshire League
Wessex Football League
Amesbury